The 1979 All-Ireland Under-21 Hurling Championship was the 16th staging of the All-Ireland Under-21 Hurling Championship since its establishment by the Gaelic Athletic Association in 1964. The championship began on 11 April 1979 and ended on 23 September 1979.

Galway entered the championship as the defending champions.

On 23 September 1979, Tipperary won the championship following a 2-12 to 1-09 defeat of Galway in the All-Ireland final. This was their third All-Ireland title overall and their first title since 1967.

Kilkenny's Michael Nash was the championship's top scorer with 3-23.

Results

Leinster Under-21 Hurling Championship

Quarter-finals

Semi-finals

Final

Munster Under-21 Hurling Championship

First round

Semi-finals

Final

Ulster Under-21 Hurling Championship

Final

All-Ireland Under-21 Hurling Championship

Semi-finals

Final

Championship statistics

Top scorers

Overall

Miscellaneous

 On 16 April 1979, Kerry won their first and, to date, only Munster Championship match when they defeated Waterford by 3-06 to 0-10.

References

Under
All-Ireland Under-21 Hurling Championship